Marcellus James McCarver, better known by his stage name Celly Cel, is an American rapper from Vallejo, California. He released his first single, "Lifestyle of a Mack", on his independent record label Realside Records in 1992. He released his debut studio album, Heat 4 Yo Azz, in 1994, and released a second album, Killa Kali, two years later.

In 1996, he appeared on the Red Hot Organization's compilation album, America is Dying Slowly, alongside Biz Markie, Wu-Tang Clan, and Fat Joe, among many other prominent hip hop artists.  The album, meant to raise awareness of the AIDS epidemic among African American men, was heralded as "a masterpiece" by The Source magazine.

His next appearance wasn't until 1998, with his third album: The G Filez. Deep Conversation followed in mid-2000.

Celly has collaborated with fellow Bay Area rappers E-40 & B-Legit on several occasions.

Discography

Studio albums

Collaboration albums
 Criminal Activity with Criminalz (2001)
 Bad Influence with The Hillside Stranglaz (2006)
 Bay Waters Run Deep with San Quinn (2018)

Compilation albums
 The Best of Celly Cel (1999)
 Live From the Ghetto (2001)
 Song'z U Can't Find (2002)
 The Wild West (2006)
 The Gumbo Pot (2006)
 Cali Luv (2007)
 Best of Celly Cel 2: Tha Sick Wid It Dayz (2007)
 The Lost Tapes (2016)

Extended plays
 Big Faces EP (2012)

External links 
 Celly Cel on Myspace

References 

Living people
Year of birth missing (living people)
21st-century American rappers
African-American rappers
Gangsta rappers
G-funk artists
Hip hop record producers
Jive Records artists
Rappers from the San Francisco Bay Area
Musicians from Vallejo, California
21st-century African-American musicians